Transcisco Tours  was an excursion railroad offering service between San Jose, California and Reno, Nevada on the twice-a-week Sierra 49er Express train. Parent company, Transcisco Industries, was also responsible for operating The Texan dinner train near San Antonio under a subsidiary company, the Transcisco Texas Railway.

History

Transcisco Industries
Transcisco Industries was founded in 1972 by Mark Hungerford to lease and manage rail cars; in the early 1980s it was split into two publicly-traded firms: Transcisco and PLM International. In 1990, Transcisco began passenger operations with three announcements: first, a new contract with Amtrak to operate luxury train service between the San Francisco Bay Area and Reno, Nevada; second, that it was negotiating with Amtrak for similar service between Los Angeles and Las Vegas; and third, that it was acquiring a dinner train in San Antonio. However, passenger service proved to be unprofitable, and Transcisco would file for bankruptcy in July 1991.

The company emerged from bankruptcy in September 1993 and in 1995 announced a contract to maintain rail cars leased to Burlington Northern and Southern Pacific. In addition, the company owned a substantial stake in the Russian firm  (SovFinAmTrans, short for Soviet-Finnish-American Transportation Company), a rail transportation service provider.

In April 1995, Johnstown America Industries, a railcar manufacturer, made an unsolicited takeover offer of first $1.50, then $1.75 per share (approximately $9 million total). Although Johnstown's second offer was higher than the value of the stock and Hungerford supported it, Transcisco rejected the buyout offer in late May 1995. One year later, in May 1996, Transcisco accepted a buyout offer of $6.50 per share (approximately $46 million) from Trinity Rail Management, which also assumed control of the MCHX reporting mark.

Sierra 49er Express train
The Sierra 49er Express started from San Jose and offered stops in Oakland, Richmond, Martinez, Sacramento, and Truckee, with connecting van service to Lake Tahoe and Reno. Trains departed from San Jose on Mondays and Fridays, returning on Wednesday and Sunday, respectively. The cost of the ticket depended on the hotel selected for the stay. Total trip time was seven hours for a  ride.

Onboard, passengers could dine and dance (in the Club High Sierra, a converted Pullman Gallery Car which had previously been used on the Southern Pacific Peninsula Commute service between San Jose and San Francisco) or experience live entertainment, including strolling bards playing guitars while dressed as vintage train engineers. The service was called a "cruise train" and was meant to appeal to travelers seeking fun on the journey as well as retirees. Amtrak employees handled train operations, while Transcisco employees provided on-board customer service. Transcisco stated that it would need 50,000 riders per year to continue service.

The Sierra 49er Express started service on December 7, 1990 with a reported 18,000 advance ticket sales. Although the service filled the void left by the Reno Fun Train, which had operated for two decades had been canceled recently, the Sierra 49er Express did not attract the ridership it needed to break even and the service was quickly withdrawn; the last train ran on April 29, 1991.

The Texan dinner train
The rolling stock for The Texan were acquired from the Texas Southern dinner train (TXSO).

Washington Central Railway (WCRC) acquired the three locomotives and eight cars that were used for The Texan and announced plans to run a three-hour dinner train along Burlington Northern right-of-way between Montgomery, Illinois and Ottawa, Illinois. BC Rail (BCOL) would later acquire the eight coaches and used them for the Pacific Starlight Dinner Train, adding two more (one Super Dome, ex-MILW 57 and one auxiliary power unit) which ran between 1997 and 2002. The cars were planned for refurbishment in 2012, but due to the presence of asbestos, the cars were sold instead.

Rolling stock

Locomotives

Of the three EMD F45 locomotives, the only one equipped with head-end power was 1001.

Coaches

As part of the bankruptcy filing, Transcisco Tours and Transcisco Texas Railways both liquidated their rolling stock by February 1993.

References

External links
 

Defunct California railroads
Railway companies established in 1990
Railway companies disestablished in 1991
1990 establishments in California
1991 disestablishments in California